The Hummingbird Springs Wilderness is a  wilderness administered by the Bureau of Land Management (BLM). The wilderness is located in the northwest of Maricopa County in northern regions of the central Sonoran Desert of Arizona.

The wilderness is located at the northwest end of the Belmont Mountains; the southwest border of the wilderness is the northeast border of the Big Horn Mountains Wilderness, of the Big Horn Mountains (Arizona); this two-mountain region lies at the north and northwest of the small Tonopah Desert, a desert plains region. The northwest of both mountain ranges drain northwest into Tiger Wash, in the upper-central region of a southeast flowing Centennial Wash, a tributary to the Gila River in central, lower elevation desert Arizona.

See also
 List of Arizona Wilderness Areas

References

External links 

 Hummingbird Springs Wilderness, Arizona Wilderness Areas – Public Lands
 Hummingbird Springs Wilderness, BLM
 Hummingbird Springs Wilderness, wilderness.net

Protected areas of Maricopa County, Arizona
Wilderness areas of Arizona
Bureau of Land Management areas in Arizona